Bankliya is a village in Ladnu tehsil of Nagaur district in the Indian state of Rajasthan.
The village is situated on mega highway Kishangarh to Hanumangarh between Ladnun and Didwana.

Geography

Demographics

 India census, Bakaliya had a population of 2,923. Males constitute 1,484 of the population and females 1,439.

References 

Villages in Nagaur district